The Judgment is a 2014 Bulgarian drama film directed by . It was selected as the Bulgarian entry for the Best Foreign Language Film at the 88th Academy Awards but it was not nominated.

Plot
The film takes place in Bulgaria by the Rhodope Mountains, near the Turkish border. A widower, Mityo, needs money to forestall foreclosure on his home. He drives a milk tanker but business is slow, so he reluctantly accepts a job smuggling migrants over the border into Bulgaria. (A character in the film describes the migrants as "Gypsies, Arabs, and blacks"; many of them are presumably Refugees of the Syrian Civil War.) The work reminds Mityo of his military service in the late 1980s, assigned to the Bulgarian border guard, where his task was to prevent citizens from leaving the Eastern Bloc.

Cast
 Assen Blatechki as Mitio
 Ovanes Torosian as Vasko
 Ina Nikolova as Maria
 Predrag Manojlovic as The Captain
  as Kera
 Meto Jovanovski as The Doctor
  as Ramadan

See also
 List of submissions to the 88th Academy Awards for Best Foreign Language Film
 List of Bulgarian submissions for the Academy Award for Best Foreign Language Film

References

External links
  (Premium Films, international sales agent)
 
 Cineuropa

2014 films
2014 drama films
Bulgarian drama films
2010s Bulgarian-language films
Films set in Bulgaria
Films shot in Bulgaria
Films about refugees